Sir William Rule (c.1750–1816) was a shipbuilder and designer to the Royal Navy who rose to be Surveyor of the Navy. 

Designing during the Napoleonic Wars, many of his ships took place in the critical battles: Nile, Trafalgar, Copenhagen, etc.

Life
He was born in south England around 1750.

He first appears in Royal Navy records in April 1778 as a Master Mastmaker at Woolwich Dockyard, however this position infers both an apprenticeship as a ships carpenter and a period in the dockyards as a standard mastmaker. In September 1778 he was promoted to Master Boatbuilder at Portsmouth Dockyard.

In February 1779 he moved to Sheerness Dockyard, first as Master Shipwright then as Master Caulker. By 1787 he was Assistant Master Shipwright at Portsmouth Dockyard, and in March of that year was appointed Master Shipwright back at Sheerness Dockyard thereafter having overall charge of all ships constructed there, and from this point the Royal Navy list the ships built under his charge.

In August 1790 he moved to Woolwich as Master Shipwright and in February 1793 he was appointed Surveyor of the Navy working alongside Sir John Henslow. In June 1806 Henslow retired and from then Rule worked with Henry Peake.

In June 1813 Rule was replaced as Surveyor of the Navy by Joseph Tucker and Robert Seppings (jointly) apparently due to Rule's ill-health.

Rule died in 1816, his will being read on 29 February 1816. The will is held at the National Archives in Kew.

Ships built

HMS Leopard (1790) 50 gun ship of the line
HMS Martin (1790) 16 gun sloop
HMS Minotaur (1793) 74 gun ship of the line with a colourful history

Ships designed

Note: dates in brackets represent date of design not launch)
Amazon-class frigate (1795) four 36-gun frigates
Caledonia-class ship of the line (1794) nine huge 120-gun ships of the line
Merlin-class sloop (1795)
Albatross-class brig-sloop (1795) eight 18-gun brigs
HMS Dragon (1795) 74-gun ship of the line
HMS Acasta (1795) 40-gun frigate
HMS Naiad (1795) 38-gun frigate
Amphion-class frigate (1796) a number of 32-gun frigates
Snake-class ship-sloop (1796) a number of 18-gun sloops
Cruizer-class brig-sloop (1796) a number of 16-gun sloops
Courser-class gunboat (1797) a number of 12-gun gunboats
HMS Osprey (1797) 18-gun sloop
Apollo-class frigate (1798) twenty-seven 36-gun frigates
HMS Plantagenet (1798) 74-gun ship of the line
Lively-class frigate (1799) sixteen 38-gun frigates
Repulse-class ship of the line (1800) a series of eleven 74-gun ships of the line
HMS Ethalion (1800) 38-gun frigate
Archer-class gun-brig (1800) 12-gun gun-brig
HMS Euryalus (1801) 36-gun frigate
HMS Impregnable (1802) 98-gun ship of the line eventually launched in 1810
Confounder-class gun-brig (1804) a series of 12-gun gun-brigs
HMS Bulwark (1804) 74-gun ship of the line
HMS Seagull (1805) 16-gun sloop
Banterer-class post ship (1805) a series of six 22-gun post ships
HMS Horatio (1805) 38-gun frigate
HMS Bucephalus (1806) 32-gun frigate
HMS Tuscan (1808) 16-gun sloop
Decoy-class cutter (1809) three 10-gun cutters
Salisbury-class ship of the line (1810) a series of 50-gun ship of the line
HMS Bacchante (1810) 38-gun frigate
Bold-modified Confounder-class gun-brig (1811) a series of 12-gun gun-brigs
HMS Forte (1811) 38-gun frigate
HMS Jupiter (1811) 50-gun ship of the line
HMS Teazer (1811) 12-gun sloop
HMS Creole (1811) 36-gun frigate
Scamander-class frigate (1812) a series of ten 36-gun frigates
Cyrus-class ship-sloop (1812) a series of sixteen 20-gun flush-desk post-ships
Conway-class post ship (1813) a series of ten 20-gun post-ships
HMS Acute (1813) 12-gun brig
HMS Snapper (1813) 12-gun gun-brig
HMS Trafalgar (1813) huge 106-gun ship of the line (later renamed Camperdown)
HMS Leander (1813) 58-gun frigate
HMS Bold (1812 or 1813) 12-gun gun-brig
Favorite-class sloop (1813) a series of 18-gun sloops
HMS Griper (1813) 12-gun gun-brig
HMS Adder (1813) 12-gun gun-brig
HMS Havock (date unclear) 12-gun gun-brig
HMS Pelican (date unclear) 16-gun sloop

References
 

1816 deaths
Surveyors of the Navy